St. Michael's Catholic Church may refer to:

New Zealand
 St Michael's Catholic Church, Auckland

United Arab Emirates 
 St. Michael's Catholic Church, Sharjah

United Kingdom 
 St Michael's Catholic Church, Moor Street

United States 
Saint Michael's Catholic Church (Galena, Illinois)
St. Michael's Catholic Church (Holbrook, Iowa)
St. Michael's Catholic Church (Port Austin, Michigan), listed on the National Register of Historic Places in Huron County, Michigan
St. Michael's Catholic Church (Tarnov, Nebraska), listed on the National Register of Historic Places in Platte County, Nebraska
 St. Michael's Catholic Church (Mechanicsburg, Ohio)
St. Michael's Catholic Church (Cedar Hill, Tennessee)
St. Michael's Catholic Church (Cuero, Texas), listed on the National Register of Historic Places in De Witt County, Texas

See also 
 St. Michael's Church (disambiguation)